Helmut Norpoth (born 1943) is an American political scientist and professor of political science at Stony Brook University. Norpoth is best known for developing the Primary Model to predict US presidential elections.

Education and career
Norpoth received his undergraduate degree from the Free University of Berlin in Germany in 1966. He then attended the University of Michigan, where he received his M.A. and Ph.D. in 1967 and 1974, respectively. Before joining Stony Brook University as an assistant professor in 1979, he taught at the University of Arizona (visiting lecturer in the Political Science Department in 1978), the University of Cologne, and the University of Texas. In 1980, he was promoted to associate professor at Stony Brook University, and became a tenured full professor there in 1985.

Research
Norpoth's research focuses on multiple subjects in political science, including public opinion and electoral behavior, and predicting the results of elections in the United States, Great Britain, and Germany. Norpoth's Primary Model has successfully matched the results of 25 out of 28 US Presidential elections since 1912, with the exceptions being those in 1960, 2000, and 2020.

"Primary Model" for U.S. presidential elections

Norpoth developed the Primary Model, a statistical model of United States presidential elections based on data going back to 1912. The Primary Model is based on two factors: whether the party that has been in power for a long time seems to be about to lose it, and whether a given candidate did better in the primaries than his or her opponent. The model was first used in the 1996 election.

Recent misses

2016
In February 2015, Norpoth projected that Republicans had a 65 percent chance of winning the general election the following year. In 2016, this model gained significant media attention because it predicted that Donald Trump would win the general election. In response to critics who cited polls in which Clinton led Trump by a significant margin, Norpoth said that these polls were not taking into account who will actually vote in November, writing, "…nearly all of us say, oh yes, I'll vote, and then many will not follow through."

Despite the attention for predicting Donald Trump would win in 2016, Norpoth's model only said that Donald Trump would win the two-party popular vote with 52.5%. Donald Trump actually lost the 2016 two party popular vote with 48.9%.

2020
On March 2, 2020, Norpoth stated that his model gave Trump a 91% chance at winning re-election. His model also predicted that Trump would win with up to 362 electoral votes. This would have required Trump to have flipped several Clinton states from 2016.

However, this prediction proved to be inaccurate. Trump did not flip any states Clinton won in 2016, and ended up losing 5 states plus one electoral vote in Nebraska that he won in 2016, ultimately losing the election with 232 electoral votes to Joe Biden's 306 electoral votes. 

Norpoth cited a "perfect storm" of subsequent surprise events following his prediction that were not taken into account, notably the COVID-19 pandemic in the United States which led to lockdowns, beginning only a few weeks after his prediction, and an economic downturn, which was not improved due to perceived inadequate response by the President. The pandemic also led to an increase in mail-in and absentee ballots, which would lean toward the Democratic candidate. Civil unrest over the murder of George Floyd on May 25, 2020 was also cited as a factor.

References

External links
Faculty page
Primary Model

Stony Brook University faculty
1943 births
Living people
American political scientists
Free University of Berlin alumni
University of Michigan alumni
University of Texas faculty
Academic staff of the University of Cologne